The 1936–37 UCLA Bruins men's basketball team represented the University of California, Los Angeles during the 1936–37 NCAA men's basketball season and were members of the Pacific Coast Conference. The Bruins were led by 16th year head coach Caddy Works. They finished the regular season with a record of 6–15 and were fourth in the southern division with a record of 2–10.

Previous season

The Bruins finished the regular season with a record of 10–13 and were fourth in the southern division with a record of 2–10.

Roster

Schedule

|-
!colspan=9 style=|Regular Season

Source

Notes

References

UCLA Bruins men's basketball seasons
Ucla
UCLA Bruins Basketball
UCLA Bruins Basketball